The expression series-parallel can apply to different domains:

 Series and parallel circuits for electrical circuits and electronic circuits
 Series-parallel partial order, in partial order theory
 Series–parallel graph in graph theory
 Series–parallel networks problem, a combinatorial problem about series–parallel graphs